The gravitation water vortex power plant is a type of micro hydro vortex turbine system which is capable of converting energy in a moving fluid to rotational energy using a low hydraulic head of . This technology is based on a round basin with a central drain. Above the drain the water forms a stable line vortex which drives a water turbine.

Precourse design where patented in 1877 and 1967.

The specific design described here was first patented by Greek-Australian Lawyer and Inventor Paul Kouris in 1996, who was searching for a way to harness the power inherent in a vortex. 

Later, Austrian Inventor Franz Zotlöterer created a similar turbine while attempting to find a way to aerate water without an external power source.

Design 

The water passes through a straight inlet and then passes tangentially into a round basin. The water forms a vortex over the center bottom drain of the basin. A turbine withdraws rotational energy from the vortex, which is converted into electric energy by a generator.

The turbine's theoretical energy conversion efficiency is up to 85%; a test installation reported 73% efficiency, and after a year of use its installation cost was just under one US dollar per Watt of output capacity.

The turbine's aeration of the water helps improve water conditions, while the reduced speeds of the turbine and the lack of cavitation ensure that most types of fish can pass through the turbine without danger, something which is much more difficult to achieve at normal hydro plants that require additional structures for the fish migration.

References

External links 
 Water vortex plant 500w demonstration (video)
 Turbine a Vortice, Orizzontenergia
 Gravitational Water Vortex Plant Project Video

Water turbines